François Franck (14 September 1904 – 6 August 1965) was a Belgian ice hockey player. He won a bronze medal at the 1924 Ice Hockey European Championships, and finished seventh and fifth at the 1924 and 1928 Winter Olympics, respectively.

References

External links
 

1904 births
1965 deaths
Ice hockey players at the 1924 Winter Olympics
Ice hockey players at the 1928 Winter Olympics
Olympic ice hockey players of Belgium
Belgian ice hockey defencemen
Sportspeople from Antwerp